The 11061 / 62 Lokmanya Tilak Terminus–Muzaffarpur Pawan Express is an Express train belonging to Indian Railways – Central Railway zone that runs between Lokmanya Tilak Terminus &  in India.

It operates as train number 11061 from Lokmanya Tilak Terminus to Muzaffarpur Junction and as train number 11062 in the reverse direction, serving the states of Maharashtra, Madhya Pradesh, Uttar Pradesh and Bihar.

Coaches

The 11061 / 62 Lokmanya Tilak Terminus–Muzaffarpur Pawan Express has 1 AC 2 tier, 1 AC 3 tier, 12 Sleeper class, 6 General Unreserved & 2 SLR (Seating cum Luggage Rake) coaches. In addition, it carries a pantry car  .
 
As is customary with most train services in India, coach composition may be amended at the discretion of Indian Railways depending on demand.

Service

Routeing

Traction

The train is hauled by an Itarsi-based WAP-4 or WAM-4  from Lokmanya Tilak Terminus until  after which Itarsi-based WDM-3A or WDM-3D (single or twins) locomotives power the train until Darbhanga Junction.

Operation

11061 Lokmanya Tilak Terminus–Muzaffarpur Pawan Express runs from Lokmanya Tilak Terminus every day in the week reaching Darbhanga Junction the next day .

11062 Muzaffarpur Lokmanya Tilak Terminus Pawan Express runs from Darbhanga Junction every day of the week reaching Lokmanya Tilak Terminus on the 3rd day.

See also 

 Lokmanya Tilak Terminus railway station
 Bhagalpur–Lokmanya Tilak Terminus Superfast Express
 Lokmanya Tilak Terminus–Darbhanga Pawan Express

References 

 http://www.irfca.org/gallery/Events/cracdcjan13/
 http://www.holidayiq.com/railways/pawan-express-11061-train.html
 https://www.youtube.com/watch?v=_rYYu3f3MEI
 https://www.flickr.com/photos/sagittariangemini/5793657804/
 http://irfca.org/apps/locolinks/show/100

External links

Express trains in India
Rail transport in Maharashtra
Rail transport in Madhya Pradesh
Rail transport in Uttar Pradesh
Rail transport in Bihar
Transport in Mumbai
Transport in Muzaffarpur